Burmese Buddhist titles (သာသနာတော်ဆိုင်ရာ ဘွဲ့တံဆိပ်တော်များ) encompass numerous honorific titles conferred by the Burmese government, to recognize members of the Sangha as well as civilians. These religious titles are conferred annually by the Burmese government, in a special ceremony during the full moon day of Tabaung, at the Uppatasanti Pagoda in Naypyidaw. From 1988 to 2008, the ceremony was held at the Mahāpāsaṇa Cave, near Kaba Aye Pagoda in Yangon.

History 
In the pre-colonial era, the Burmese monarchy recognized Buddhist monks and laypersons by bestowing religious titles composed of Pali and native Burmese styles. Sayadaw (ဆရာတော်), which literally means "teacher of royalty," was originally bestowed to monks who had educated the king as monastic teachers or tutors, although its usage grew more commonplace with time.

Pagan era 
During the Pagan Kingdom, several kings awarded religious titles to prominent Buddhist monks.

Pinya and Innwa eras

Konbaung era 
The reign of Mindon Min also saw a liberalization in the usage of Sayadaw as a title, which became widely conferred to accomplished monks, regardless of whether they had personally educated the king. Nowadays, Sayadaw is routinely used as a title for all senior monks.

Colonial era 
From 1915 to 1942, the British colonial government conferred the title  (အဂ္ဂမဟာပဏ္ဍိတ) to 98 monks.

Post-independence era 
In 1948, Burma achieved independence from Great Britain. From 1951 through 1953, the Burmese government awarded the  title to 15 monks. From March to July 1953, the government convened a special committee to establish a new system of religious titles. The new system, which included titles for monks and civilians, was introduced on 28 July 1953:
 Clerical religious titles
 
  (အဘိဓဇမဟာရဋ္ဌဂုရု) 
 Civilian religious titles
 Pyinna Kyaw (ပညာကျော်)
  (ပညာဗလ)
  (မဟာပညာဗလ)
Following the Sixth Buddhist council and introduction of the Tipiṭakadhara examinations, a new series of titles recognizing academic merit, was introduced by the government. Mingun Sayadaw, in 1953, became the first recipient of the newly minted  (တိပိဋကဓရ ဓမ္မဘဏ္ဍာဂါရိက) title.

During the socialist era from 1978 to 1988, the system of civilian titles was abolished altogether. The practice of conferring Buddhist titles to civilians was reinstated on 24 May 1991 by the State Law and Order Restoration Council, which added 20 new religious titles, including 3 scholarly titles, 4 domestic and international religious propagation titles, and 4 civilian titles for men, and 4 for women.

Monks who pass selective monastic examinations organised by two private organisations are granted a monastic title, -bhivaṃsa, which is suffixed to their monastic name (e.g., Ashin Nandamalabhivamsa).

Modern-day system 
On 17 June 2015, the Office of the President of Myanmar issued a directive amending the existing system of Buddhist titles recognized by the government. The system is divided into 7 categories, outlined below:
 Pariyatti titles
  (အဘိဓဇမဟာရဋ္ဌဂုရု)
  (အဂ္ဂမဟာပဏ္ဍိတ)
 Tipiṭakadhara Dhammabhaṇḍāgārika (တိပိဋကဓရ ဓမ္မဘဏ္ဍာဂါရိက)
 Academic instruction titles
  (အဂ္ဂမဟာဂန္ထဝါစကပဏ္ဍိတ)
  (မဟာဂန္ထဝါစကပဏ္ဍိတ)
  (ဂန္ထဝါစကပဏ္ဍိတ)
 Dhammakatika titles
  (မဟာဓမ္မကထိက ဗဟုဇနဟိတဓရ)
  (ဓမ္မကထိက ဗဟုဇနဟိတဓရ)
 Religious propagation titles
 
 
 
 
 Kammapaṭṭhana titles
 
 
 
 Sāsanānuggaha titles
  (အဂ္ဂမဟာသီရိသုဓမ္မမဏိဇောတဓရ)
  (အဂ္ဂမဟာသီရိသုဓမ္မသိင်္ဂီ)
  (သီရိသုဓမ္မမဏိဇောတဓရ)
  (သီရိသုဓမ္မသိင်္ဂီ)
  (သီဟသုဓမ္မမဏိဇောတဓရ)
  (သီဟသုဓမ္မသိင်္ဂီ)
  (သုဓမ္မမဏိဇောတဓရ)
  (သုဓမ္မသိင်္ဂီ)

References

See also 
 Agga Maha Pandita
 Buddhism in Myanmar
 List of Sāsana Azani recipients
 Mahanayaka
 Sangharaja
 Sayadaw
 State Saṅgha Mahā Nāyaka Committee
 Thathanabaing of Burma
 Tipitakadhara Tipitakakovida Selection Examinations

 
Burmese culture
Burmese language
Names by culture